The Universiti Sains Malaysia (USM) Engineering Campus is located in Transkrian, Nibong Tebal, South Seberang Perai, Penang. The campus covers an area about 320 acres. It is located approximately 45 km from the Main Campus in Gelugor, Penang. The university has produced more than 50,000 engineers since 1986.

History
The initiation of this campus is aligned with USM's specific ambition, and government's general expectations to develop the studies in the engineering field in order to produce an all-rounder human capital that will be the heart and drive for the development and progress of the nation. It was started at the School of Applied Sciences, Main Campus in 1972. The era of engineering studies began at the university in 1984 when the school was restructured into two disciplines of studies and was named the School of Engineering Science and Industrial Technology. In accordance to the necessity of the development of this field of studies, encouraged USM to separate this field of study physically. Hence, the branch campus was developed to specifically cater the engineering field of studies.

Originally the campus was located in Seri Iskandar, Perak and back then the campus is known as Universiti Sains Malaysia Perak Branch Campus (abbreviated as KCP). After operating there for 15 years (1986–2001), the campus was relocated to the present site and hence known as the Engineering Campus. The present campus area was an oil palm plantation and oil palm trees are still can be seen today at certain sections of the campus.

Location
The campus is in Transkrian. It is a very special area at the borders of three states: Penang, Perak and Kedah. The campus is about 4 km from Nibong Tebal, 4 km from Parit Buntar, Perak and 8.3 km from Bandar Baharu, Kedah. Other institutes nearby are Arumugam Pillai Industrial Training Institute, Nibong Tebal and Transkrian MARA Junior Science College.

{
  "type": "ExternalData",
  "service": "geoshape",
  "ids": "Q7894432",
  "properties": {
    "title": "Universiti Sains Malaysia",
    "description": "Engineering Campus",
  }
}

Schools and Centres of Excellence

Schools
 The School of Aerospace Engineering
 The School of Civil Engineering
 The School of Chemical Engineering
 The School of Electrical & Electronic Engineering
 The School of Materials and Mineral Resources Engineering
 The School of Mechanical Engineering
 The School of Languages, Literacies & Translation

Research Centres
REDAC – River Engineering & Urban Drainage Research Centre
CEDEC – Collaborative µElectronic Design Excellence Centre
Centre of Engineering Excellence
Waste Management Cluster
Engineering Innovation and Technology Development (EITD)

Administrative
Centre for Knowledge, Communication & Technology (PPKT)
Registry Department
Bursary
Library
Health Centre
Development Department
Security Department

Desasiswa (Residential Colleges)
Desasiswa Lembaran
Desasiswa Jaya
Desasiswa Utama (off-campus residential college)

Others
Division of Student Affairs & Development
Islamic Centre
Kelab Kebajikan & Sukan Staf Kejuruteraan(KKSSK)

Infrastructures

The campus has quite a complete facilities/infrastructures to cater the needs of the students. There are a library, a main hall, Islamic Centre, 3 cafeterias, ATMs, a banquet hall, a sports complex, convenience stores, Photostat shops, a track, Pusat Mahasiswa (which houses Mahasiswa Hall, Dance Studio, etc.), an examination hall, a lecture hall complex and two hangars for the School of Aerospace Engineering. The campus also has a few lakes. Some of these lakes are meant for REDAC research. The campus provides a roofed pedestrian walk nicknamed the Susur Gajah that connects the hostel blocks and the schools.

Ranking
In 2017 QS World University Ranking by Subject, two of Engineering subjects based in Universiti Sains Malaysia Engineering Campus ranked top 50 in the world.

References

External links
Engineering Campus Official Website

Universities and colleges in Penang
Engineering universities and colleges in Malaysia
Universiti Sains Malaysia
Educational institutions established in 1972
1972 establishments in Malaysia